Sir John Crossley Wood (1932–2014) was formerly professor of law and Dean of the School of Law at the University of Sheffield. For his work as an industrial arbitrator and conciliator he was appointed a CBE and then granted a knighthood.

Career
His principal subjects were Criminal Law and Employment Law, and he published extensively (books and articles) in those two subjects. He played an important part in building student numbers in the Law School from 13 in 1955 to over 2,000 by 2000. He lectured and tutored students in those  subjects throughout his academic career.

Sir John had wide experience of practical relations as inter alia a chairman of wages councils, chairman of the Central Arbitration Committee and the leading member of the ACAS panel of industrial arbitrators.

His roles and titles include: 
 Chairman of a Mental Health Review Tribunal
 Honorary Fellow of the Royal College of Psychiatrists
 Government Adviser in the field of industrial relations
 Chairman of ACAS (the Arbitration, Conciliation and Advisory Service)
 Chairman of the Central Arbitration Committee
 UK representative on the International Labour Organization (ILO)
 Chairman of the ILO's Committee of Experts.

Publications 
 "Industrial Law" - Smith & Wood - Butterworths
 "Cases and Materials on Criminal Law" - Elliott & Wood - Sweet & Maxwell

External links
 University of Sheffield School of Law

References

1932 births
2014 deaths